Passy is a surname of French locational origin, derived from the Gallo-Roman Praenomen Paccius. The surname migrated to England during the 12th Century. It has variants, including: Passie, Passey, Peacey, Pacey, and Piosey. It is uncommon as a personal name. People with the surname include:

Passy family, a prominent French political family, descendants of Louis François Passy (see article)
Adele Passy-Cornet (1838–1915), German operatic soprano
Antoine François Passy (1792–1873), French politician, geologist, and botanist
Frédéric Passy (1822–1912), French economist, author, politician, and pacifist; father of Paul
Isaac Passy (1928–2010), Bulgarian Jewish philosopher, and aesthetician; father of Soloman
Jacques Passy (born 1975), Mexican football manager and coach
Hippolyte Passy (1793–1880), French cavalry officer, economist, and politician
Paul Passy (1859–1940), French linguist; son of Frédéric
Solomon Passy (born 1956), Bulgarian scientist, mathematician, and politician; son of Isaac

References

See also
Pacey